Brian G. Case (14 January 1958) is an English former professional rugby league footballer who played in the 1970s, 1980s and 1990s.

Background
Brian Case's birth was registered in St. Helens, Lancashire, England.

Playing career

Warrington
Case played for Warrington from 1976 to 1982, scoring 14 tries in 191 appearances. In January 1983, he joined Wigan for a transfer fee of £50,000.

John Player Trophy Final appearances
Case played left-, i.e. number 11, in Warrington's 14-16 defeat by Widnes in the 1978–79 John Player Trophy Final during the 1977–78 season at Knowsley Road, St. Helens on Saturday 28 April 1979, and played right-, i.e. number 10, in the 12-5 victory over Barrow in the 1980–81 John Player Trophy Final during the 1980–81 season at Central Park, Wigan on Saturday 24 January 1981.

Wigan

Championship appearances
Brian Case played in Wigan's victory in the Championship during the 1986–87 season.

Premiership Final appearances
Brian Case played left-, i.e. number 8, in Wigan's 8-0 victory over Warrington in the Premiership Final during the 1986–87 season at Old Trafford, Manchester on Sunday 17 May 1987.

World Club Challenge
Brian Case played right-, i.e. number 10, in Wigan's 8-2 victory over Manly-Warringah Sea Eagles in the 1987 World Club Challenge at Central Park, Wigan on Wednesday 7 October 1987.

Challenge Cup Final appearances
Brian Case played right-, i.e. number 10, in Wigan's 28-24 victory over Hull F.C. in the 1985 Challenge Cup Final during the 1984–85 season at Wembley Stadium, London on Saturday 4 May 1985, and played left-, i.e. number 8, in the 32-12 victory over Halifax in the 1988 Challenge Cup Final during the 1987–88 season at Wembley Stadium, London on Saturday 30 April 1988.

County Cup Final appearances
Brian Case played right-, i.e. number 10, in Warrington's 26-10 victory over Wigan in the 1980 Lancashire County Cup Final during the 1980–81 season at Knowsley Road, St. Helens, on Saturday 4 October 1980, played right- in Wigan's 18-26 defeat by St. Helens in the 1984 Lancashire County Cup Final during the 1984–85 season at Central Park, Wigan on Sunday 28 October 1984, played as an interchange/substitute, i.e. number 15, (replacing  Shaun Edwards) in the 34-8 victory over Warrington in the 1985 Lancashire County Cup Final during the 1985–86 season at Knowsley Road, St. Helens, on Sunday 13 October 1985, played right- in Wigan's 15-8 victory over Oldham in the 1986 Lancashire County Cup Final during the 1986–87 season at Knowsley Road, St. Helens, on Sunday 19 October 1986, and played left-, i.e. number 8, in the 28-16 victory over Warrington in the 1987 Lancashire County Cup Final during the 1987–88 season at Knowsley Road, St. Helens, on Sunday 11 October 1987.

John Player Trophy Final appearances
Brian Case played as an interchange/substitute, i.e. number 15, (replacing  Graeme West) in Wigan's 15-4 victory over Leeds in the 1982–83 John Player Trophy Final during the 1982–83 season at Elland Road, Leeds on Saturday 22 January 1983, and played right-, i.e. number 10, in the 18-4 victory over Warrington in the 1986–87 John Player Special Trophy Final during the 1986–87 season at Burnden Park, Bolton on Saturday 10 January 1987.

Notable tour matches
Brian Case played left-, i.e. number 8, in Wigan's 14-8 victory over New Zealand in the 1985 New Zealand rugby league tour of Great Britain and France match at Central Park, Wigan on Sunday 6 October 1985.

Leigh
In August 1989, Case and his team-mate Ian Potter were signed by Leigh for a combined fee of £62,500. He played 43 times for the club before retiring in 1991.

International honours
Case won a cap for England while at Warrington in 1981 against France, and won caps for Great Britain while at Wigan in 1984 against Australia, and New Zealand (3 matches), in 1987 against Papua New Guinea; and in 1988 against Papua New Guinea, and Australia (interchange/substitute). He also played three times for Lancashire three times.

References

External links
Statistics at wigan.rlfans.com
Statistics at wolvesplayers.thisiswarrington.co.uk

1958 births
Living people
England national rugby league team players
English rugby league players
Great Britain national rugby league team players
Lancashire rugby league team players
Leigh Leopards players
Missing middle or first names
Rugby league players from St Helens, Merseyside
Rugby league props
Warrington Wolves players
Wigan Warriors players